Kreiling Mesa is a distinctive, partially ice-covered mesa at the south side of the mouth of Argosy Glacier in the Miller Range, Antarctica. It was named by the Advisory Committee on Antarctic Names for Lee W. Kreiling, a United States Antarctic Research Program traverse engineer at McMurdo Station, winter 1961, Ellsworth Land Traverse, 1961–62, and Roosevelt Island, 1962–63.

References

Mesas of Antarctica
Landforms of Oates Land